West Fife was a parliamentary constituency represented in the House of Commons of the Parliament of the United Kingdom from 1885 to 1974. Along with East Fife, it was formed by dividing the old Fife constituency.

Willie Gallacher of the Communist Party of Great Britain is notable as the  longest-serving Member of Parliament (from 1935 to 1950) and the last MP in Parliament (until 1950) for the party.

Boundaries
1885–1918:

1918–1950:

1950–1974: The Burghs of Culross, Leslie, and Markinch; the Districts of Dunfermline, Kirkcaldy, and Lochgelly; and part of the District of Wemyss.

Members of Parliament

Elections

Elections in the 1880s 

Bruce's resignation caused a by-election.

Elections in the 1890s

Elections in the 1900s

Elections in the 1910s 

General Election 1914–15:

Another General Election was required to take place before the end of 1915. The political parties had been making preparations for an election to take place and by the July 1914, the following candidates had been selected; 
Labour: William Adamson
Unionist: Joseph Hume Menzies

Elections in the 1920s

Elections in the 1930s

Elections in the 1940s

Elections in the 1950s

Elections in the 1960s

Elections in the 1970s

References

Sources
Election results, 1950 - 1974 
F. W. S. Craig, British Parliamentary Election Results 1918 - 1949
F. W. S. Craig, British Parliamentary Election Results 1885 - 1918

Politics of Fife
Historic parliamentary constituencies in Scotland (Westminster)
Constituencies of the Parliament of the United Kingdom established in 1885
Constituencies of the Parliament of the United Kingdom disestablished in 1974